Jonas Björkman and Max Mirnyi were the defending champions, but Mirnyi chose not to participate, and only Bjorkman competed that year.
Bjorkman partnered with Kevin Ullyett, and won in the final 6–1, 6–3, against Johan Brunström and Michael Ryderstedt.

Seeds

Draw

Draw

External links
 Draw

Doubles